"Milk Wars" is a 2018 American comic book crossover published by DC Comics. It features the publisher's core characters—such as Batman, Superman, and Wonder Woman—crossing over with the characters of their imprint Young Animal.

Production
According to Young Animal curator Gerard Way, the idea for a crossover between the main DC Comics line and Young Animal was proposed to him by DC. Way approved of the idea, saying he saw it as "a fun challenge, a way to reach mainstream readers, and hopefully a way to infect them with [Young Animal's] weirdness". Way, who considers Young Animal "a big experiment", was interested in reinventing DC's icons in ways that were fun. The inspiration for the series was how milk's wholesomeness could sometimes be a bad thing.

The creative teams for each issue were balanced between some individuals known for their work in Young Animal, and others known for their work in DC's main line. Each issue also features a backup story about the new character Eternity Girl by Magdalene Visaggio and Sonny Liew. Frank Quitely illustrated each issue's cover. JLA/Doom Patrol Specials cover references Grant Morrison's All Star Superman, a series that Quitely previously contributed to.

Overview

Reception
The series holds an average rating of 8.0 by 86 professional critics on the review aggregation website Comic Book Roundup.

Collected edition

References